Stadion Miejski w Kielcach (Municipal Stadium in Kielce), named Suzuki Arena due to the sponsorship reasons, is a multi-purpose stadium in Kielce, Poland. It is currently used mostly for football matches and is the home ground of Korona Kielce. The stadium holds 15,500 and was built in 2006. At the time, it was one of the most modern football stadiums in Poland.

On the 1 April 2006, eighteen months to the day that construction started on the project, its inaugural match took place, an Ekstraklasa match between Korona and Zagłębie Lubin. The match finished in a 1–1 draw.

The old stadium of Korona is currently being used by Korona Kielce II (the reserve team).

Facts 

 Total capacity: 15 500
 Capacity on international matches: 14 525
 Sitting places: 13 823
 "Młyn": 500–1 800
 Sector for visitors: 777
 Family sector: 545
 Free admission cards: 320
 Youth teams sector: 320
 Sector for VIPs: 104
 Places for press: 54
 Club: Korona Kielce
 Illumination: 1 411 lux
 Inauguration: 01/04/2006 (Korona Kielce vs. Zagłębie Lubin 1–1)
 Record attendance: 15 500 (Korona Kielce vs. Legia Warszawa 3–1, 23/09/2006)
 Project: ATJ Architekci
 Cost: 48 million PLN
 Construction period: 22/11/2004–01/04/2006
 Address: Ściegiennego 8, Kielce
 Other: heated grass, covered

Matches of the Poland national team
So far the Poland national football team played 3 matches in the new Kielce stadium. The first was against Armenia during the qualification phase of Euro 2008. The second match was against San Marino during the qualifications for the 2010 World Cup. That game was notable for two reasons: 1) the Polish team achieved its highest victory ever, 10:0, beating its 46 years old record (a 9:0 victory against Norway in 1963).
2) Poland scored its fastest goal ever thanks to Rafał Boguski, who scored for 1-0 already in the 23rd second of the game.

A friendly match against Finland took place at the stadium on 23 May 2010.

See also
 List of football stadiums in Poland

References

Korona Kielce
Kielce
Multi-purpose stadiums in Poland
Kielce
Sports venues in Świętokrzyskie Voivodeship